Tebbel is the surname of the following people:
 John William Tebbel (1912–2004), American journalist, media historian
 Maurice Tebbel (born 1994), German equestrian
 René Tebbel (born 1969), German-born equestrian show jumping rider

German-language surnames